Sakti Mohan Malik  is an Indian Politician and was Member of Parliament of the 15th Lok Sabha of India. He represented the Arambagh constituency of West Bengal and is a member of the Communist Party of India (Marxist) political party. Do not confuse Sakti Mohan Malik with J. Mohan Malik, a professor at Asia-Pacific Center for Security Studies, USA.

Early life and education
Sakti Malik was born in Chandibati, Hooghly, (West Bengal). Malik was educated in University of Burdwan and attained BEd  & MA degrees from the university. After completing his education, he became a teacher.

Political career
Sakti Malik was a first time MP. He succeeded Anil Basu from his own party who was elected seven straight terms to Lok Sabha (8th to 14th) from the same constituency.

Posts held

See also

15th Lok Sabha
Politics of India
Parliament of India
Government of India
Communist Party of India (Marxist)
Arambagh (Lok Sabha constituency)

References 

India MPs 2009–2014
1959 births
Communist Party of India (Marxist) politicians from West Bengal
Lok Sabha members from West Bengal
People from Hooghly district
Living people